The Detroit Mercy Titans basketball statistical leaders are individual statistical leaders of the Detroit Mercy Titans men's basketball program in various categories, including points, rebounds, assists, steals, and blocks. Within those areas, the lists identify single-game, single-season, and career leaders. The Titans represent the University of Detroit Mercy (UDM) in the NCAA Division I Horizon League.

UDM was established in its current form in 1990, when the University of Detroit (UD) merged with the nearby Mercy College of Detroit. With the merger, UDM inherited the UD athletic program, along with all of its records. The history of UDM men's basketball thus dates to UD's first season of basketball competition in 1905, when the school was known as Detroit College. However, the school's record book does not generally list records from before the 1950s, as records from before this period are often incomplete and inconsistent. Since scoring was much lower in this era, and teams played much fewer games during a typical season, it is likely that few or no players from this era would appear on these lists anyway.

Official NCAA basketball records date only to the 1937–38 season, the first of what it calls the "modern era" of men's basketball, following the abolition of the center jump after each made basket. Official statistical rankings in scoring began in 1947–48. Individual rebounds and assists were first officially recorded in the 1950–51 season; while rebounds have been recorded in each subsequent season, the NCAA stopped recording individual assists after the 1951–52 season, not resuming that practice until 1983–84. Individual blocks and steals were first officially recorded in 1985–86. UDM nonetheless includes player statistics from all men's basketball seasons in its record books, regardless of whether the NCAA officially recorded those statistics in the relevant seasons.

These lists are updated through UDM's win over Purdue Fort Wayne in the first round of the 2023 Horizon League tournament. Currently active players are indicated in bold.

Scoring

Rebounds

Assists

Steals

Blocks

References

Lists of college basketball statistical leaders by team
Statistical